Tadayuki (written: , , , ,  or ) is a masculine Japanese given name. Notable people with the name include: 

, Japanese baseball player
, Japanese daimyō of the late Edo period
, Japanese daimyō of the Edo period
, Japanese daimyō who ruled the Yokosuka Domain, and lived from the mid to late Edo period
, Japanese daimyō of the mid to late Edo period, who ruled the Obama Domain
, Japanese photographer
, Japanese boxer
, Japanese photographer
Tadayuki Okada (born 1967), Japanese motorcycle racer
, Japanese figure skater and coach

Japanese masculine given names